Pseudomermis is a genus of nematodes belonging to the family Mermithidae.

Species:
 Pseudomermis aorista (Steiner, 1919) 
 Pseudomermis filiformis Rubzov, 1982

References

Mermithidae